is a lighthouse located in the city of Tateyama, Chiba Prefecture, Japan at the southern tip of the Bōsō Peninsula.

History
Sunosaki Lighthouse was first lit on December 15, 1919, and completes the navigational aid systems for all vessels entering Uraga Channel and Tokyo Bay, with Kannonzaki Lighthouse and Tsurugisaki Lighthouse on the western side of Miura Peninsula, and the Nojimazaki Lighthouse and the Sunosaki Lighthouse on the eastern side of the Bōsō Peninsula.

The building is a cylindrical white structure with a height of 15 meters. The building and its supporting base are made from concrete. The focal height of the light is 45 meters above sea level.

The music video for the AKB48 song "Aitakatta" was filmed here.

See also

 List of lighthouses in Japan

References

External links

 Lighthouses in Japan 

Lighthouses completed in 1919
Buildings and structures in Chiba Prefecture
Lighthouses in Japan